PC/SC (short for "Personal Computer/Smart Card") is a specification for smart-card integration into computing environments.

Microsoft has implemented PC/SC in Microsoft Windows 200x/XP and makes it available under Microsoft Windows NT/9x.
A free implementation of PC/SC, PC/SC Lite, is available for Linux and other Unixes; a forked version comes bundled with Mac OS X.

Work group

Core members
 Gemalto
 Infineon
 Microsoft
 Toshiba

Associate members
Advanced Card Systems Alcor Micro Athena Smartcard Solutions Bloombase C3PO S.L. Cherry Electrical Products Cross S&T Inc.Dai Nippon Printing Co., Ltd.  Feitian Technologies Kobil Systems GmbH Silitek Nidec Sankyo Corporation O2Micro, Inc. OMNIKEY (HID Global) Precise Biometrics Realtek Semiconductor Corp. Research In Motion Sagem Orga  SCM Microsystems Siemens Teridian Semiconductor Corp.

See also
 CT-API, an alternative API

External links
 PC/SC Workgroup
 Free Implementation (PCSCLite)
 pcsc-tools free commandline tools for PC/SC
 Winscard Smart Card API functions in Microsoft Windows XP/2000
 SMACADU open source smart card analyzing tools
 PC/SC Reader List PC/SC-standard readers

de:PC/SC#Der PC/SC-Standard